Deshraj Karanwal is an Indian politician. He is a member of the fourteenth  Legislative Assembly from Jhabrera as a candidate of the Bharatiya Janata Party.
He contested Legislative Assembly election from Jhabrera, in 2017 and won. He is associated with the Bhartiya Janta Party.

Early life and education 
Deshraj Karanwal was born in Roorkee, Haridwar in 1969. He belongs to Dalit Caste and his wife Vijeyantimala is a schoolteacher. As per his election affidavit, Karanwal is graduated. Prior to entering politics, he was a Ration Dealer, Property Agent by profession.

Controversy 
Deshraj Karnwal had given a controversial statement regarding the violence in Delhi on 26 January 2021. While on one hand he had condemned the Delhi violence, on the other hand he had given a controversial statement. The media asked him questions about the farmers' movement and Delhi violence, he blamed the opposition for it. At the same time, he said angrily that the farmers do not want a solution.
Deshraj Karnwal had accused the leader of his own party, Kunwar Pranav Singh Champion, of endangering the life of his family. Both made verbal attacks for several days. Later both reconciled.

MLA Deshraj Karnwal has been in controversies many times. He threatened a Sugar mill officer on phone, abused the officer was also being done in the audio. Audio has gone viral on social media.

Deshraj Karnwal has given an absurd statement and created controversy, he described himself as Eklavya, targeted the opposition.

MLA Deshraj Karnwal had reached Bhagtowali village of Jhabreda police station area, to get information regarding development works. During this, he was taking information from the villagers about the development works. Meanwhile, some villagers had started abusing him. Also indecent words were used. A villager had made a video of it and put it on social media, which went viral on sight. A complaint was lodged at the Jhabreda Police Station on behalf of the MLA's private secretary Jitendra.

Requested ECI postpone election 
Bharatiya Janata Party's Jhabreda MLA Deshraj Karnwal has written a letter to the Election Commission demanding change in the date of elections in Uttarakhand. He said that since February 14 is Guru Ravidas Jayanti, the date of election should be changed in the state also on the lines of Punjab. MLA Deshraj Karnwal told that he has submitted a letter in this regard to the officials of the Election Commission of India in Delhi. But Election Commission of India did not consider his request letter and Election was held on 14 February as decided on schedule.

References

External links 

 

Living people
Uttarakhand MLAs 2017–2022
1968 births
Bharatiya Janata Party politicians from Uttarakhand
People from Haridwar district